Tumut may refer to several topics:

Tumut, a town in the Riverina region of New South Wales, Australia
Tumut Airport, the airport within the town of Tumut
Tumut River, a river that flows through the district surrounding Tumut
Tumut Hydroelectric Power Station, a series of three hydroelectric power stations on the Tumut River, that are part of the Snowy Mountains Scheme
Tumut 1
Tumut 2
Tumut 3
Tumut Pond Dam and Tumut Two Dam, two reservoirs that impound the Tumut River for the purpose of assisting the generation of hydroelectricity
Tumut Shire, a former local government authority of the area
Tumut and Kunama railway lines, a disused railway line of the area